Events from the year 1899 in Russia.

Incumbents
 Monarch – Nicholas II

Events

 1899 Russian student strike
 Akyaka Railway Station
 Peter the Great St. Petersburg Polytechnic University
 Pochvovedenie

Births

 Leonid Leonov, novelist and playwright (d. 1994)
 Georg Witt, film producer (d. 1973)
 Mikhail Zharov, actor and director (d. 1981)

Deaths

Varvara Rudneva, physician (b. 1844)

References

1899 in Russia
Years of the 19th century in the Russian Empire